Liman is a village in the municipality of Xəlilli in the Davachi Rayon of Azerbaijan.

References

Populated places in Shabran District